Callum Kyle Harriott (born 4 March 1994) is a professional footballer who plays as a winger and last played for Gillingham. He is a product of the Charlton Athletic academy. Born in England, he represents the Guyana national football team internationally.

Club career

Charlton Athletic

Born in Norbury, Harriott attended Stanley Technical High School and St.Andrews C of E high school in Croydon. He made his debut for the Addicks on 25 April 2011 in a League One game against Rochdale at The Valley, which ended in a 3–1 win for Charlton. He came on as a late substitute for loanee Dean Parrett. He then started his first game for the club two days later in the last game of the 2010–11 season against Hartlepool United.

Although he did not feature for the Charlton first-team in their 2011–12 promotion season, he made his Championship debut after coming off the bench as a 74th-minute substitute for fellow academy graduate Scott Wagstaff in a 2–1 win against Blackpool. He then scored his first senior goal on 9 March 2013, in a 1–0 win away to Huddersfield Town. He scored his second goal for Charlton in a record-breaking 6–0 away win for the Addicks against nine-man Barnsley on 13 April 2013. Harriott was one of the six different scorers for Charlton that match. On 17 May 2013, Harriott signed a new three-year contract with the club. On 3 May 2014, Harriott scored his first senior hat-trick against Blackpool in a 3–0 win at Bloomfield Road.

On 28 August 2015, Harriott was loaned to Colchester United where he was very well received by fans, before returning to Charlton on 2 January 2016.

Reading

On 5 August 2016, Harriott signed a three-year contract with Reading, moving for an undisclosed fee. He scored his first goals for Reading when he scored a brace in an EFL Cup tie against Milton Keynes Dons which Reading won 4–3 on penalties on 23 August 2016. He was released by Reading at the end of the 2018–19 season. On 8 May 2019, Harriott confirmed that he was leaving Reading following the end of the 2018–19 season.

Colchester United

On 5 September 2019, Harriott rejoined Colchester United on a two-year contract. He made first appearance in his second spell for the club on 19 October 2019, playing 60 minutes in Colchester's 1–0 home defeat by Morecambe. He scored his first goal since his return to the club on 21 December 2019 in Colchester's 3–0 win against Carlisle United.

After making 64 appearances and scoring twelve goals in his second spell with the U's, Harriott was allowed to leave the club after his contract expired in May 2021.

Gillingham
Harriott signed a short-term deal for Gillingham on 23 November 2022.  He left the club at the end of February 2023.

International career
On 2 May 2013, Harriott was named in manager Noel Blake's England under-19 team to face Belgium, Georgia and Scotland in the 2013 UEFA European Under-19 qualification round. Harriott was eligible to play for Guyana or Jamaica. He received his first call up to the Guyanese national team in March 2019, for their match against Belize and started the match. He scored his first international goal on 16 November in Guyana's 4–2 CONCACAF Nations League victory over Aruba. He featured in all three of Guyana's matches at the 2019 CONCACAF Gold Cup as they exited at the group stage.

Personal life
In July 2021, Harriott appeared in Colchester Magistrates’ Court charged with the rape of a woman in November 2019. In August 2022, Harriott was unanimously found not guilty by the jury.

Career statistics

Club

International

International goals
Scores and results list Guyana's goal tally first.

References

External links

Callum Harriott profile at Charlton Athletic's official website

1994 births
Living people
Association football midfielders
Guyanese footballers
Guyana international footballers
Guyanese people of Jamaican descent
English footballers
England youth international footballers
English people of Guyanese descent
English people of Jamaican descent
Charlton Athletic F.C. players
Colchester United F.C. players
Reading F.C. players
English Football League players
Black British sportspeople
2019 CONCACAF Gold Cup players
People charged with rape
People acquitted of rape
Gillingham F.C. players